Christian Rickley  (October 7, 1859 – October 25, 1911) was a 19th-century Major League Baseball player. He played primarily shortstop during the 1884 season for the Philadelphia Keystones of the Union Association. He appeared in six games for the Keystones in June 1884 and had five hits in 25 at-bats. He played in the minor leagues through 1890.

Sources

1859 births
1911 deaths
19th-century baseball players
Baseball players from Philadelphia
Major League Baseball shortstops
Philadelphia Keystones players
Wilmington Quicksteps (minor league) players
Williamsport (minor league baseball) players
Williamsport Lumber Citys players
Toronto Canucks players
Minor league baseball managers